Saint-Pierre-Lafeuille (Languedocien: Sent Pèire de la Fuèlha) is a commune in the Lot department in south-western France.

See also
Communes of the Lot department

References

Saintpierrelafeuille